Sláma (feminine Slámová) is a Czech surname meaning "straw". Notable people include:

 Anthony Slama, American baseball player
 Bohdan Sláma, Czech film director
 František Sláma (musician), Czech musician
 František Sláma (politician), Czech writer and politician
 Igor Sláma, Czech cyclist
 Julie Slama, American politician
 Miroslav Sláma, Czech ice hockey player
 Zdenĕk Sláma, Czech futsal player

Czech-language surnames